Oyinkan Braithwaite (born 1988) is a Nigerian-British novelist and writer. She was born in Lagos and spent her childhood in both Nigeria and the UK.

Life 
Braithwaite was born in Lagos in 1988. She spent most of her childhood in the UK after her family moved to Southgate in north London. She had her primary school education in London then returned to Lagos when her brother was born in 2001. She studied law and creative writing at Surrey University and Kingston University before moving back to Lagos in 2012.

She has worked as an assistant editor in publishing house Kachifo and as a production manager at Ajapa World, an education and entertainment company.

Career 
Braithwaite's debut book, My Sister, the Serial Killer, was published by Doubleday Books in 2018 to wide acclaim. Her short stories have appeared in McSweeney's, WePresent, and Amazon Original Stories' Hush Collection.

Braithwaite is also an illustrator, and she illustrated the cover of the Nigerian edition of her novel, which was published by Narrative Landscape Publishers.

Awards and nominations 
 2014: Shortlisted as a top ten spoken word artist in the Eko Poetry Slam
 2016: Nominated for the Commonwealth Short Story prize
 2019: Winner for LA Times Award for Best Crime Thriller in 2019
 2019: Shortlisted for the Women's Prize for Fiction in 2019
2019: Longlisted for the Booker Prize in 2019 
2019: Shortlisted for the 2019 Amazon Publishing Readers’ Awards
2020: Winner, 2020 Crime and Thriller Book of the Year in the British Book Awards
2020: Shortlisted for the 2020 Theakston's Old Peculier Crime Novel of the Year Award

Bibliography 
 The Driver (2010) – short stories
 My Sister, the Serial Killer (2018) – novel
 Treasure (2020) - short story
 The Baby is Mine (2021) - novel

References 

Nigerian women novelists
Nigerian women short story writers
Nigerian short story writers
21st-century Nigerian novelists
Iowa Writers' Workshop alumni
21st-century Nigerian women writers
Nigerian emigrants to the United Kingdom
Living people
1988 births
Anthony Award winners